Zagorka Shuke ( Kanefçe born 14 July 1914 – 17 January 2000) was an Albanian film, stage and theater actress, best known for her performance in the 1972 film"Kapedani".

Biography 
Zagorka Shuke (Kanefçe) was born in the city of Ohrid, in present-day Macedonia, on 14 July 1914 and died on 17 January 2000 in the city of Pogradec. Zagorka left Ohrid at the age of 14 with her family and settled in the city of Pogradec.  Her father was a professional fisherman and comes to the city of Pogradec to give his experience in this profession and this happened in 1926. Once settled in Pogradec Zagorka distinguished herself in the arts and attended a girls school in Tirana after which she returned to Pogradec where to continue her artistic endeavors. Zagorka was the first woman to participate in the Amateur Theater of the city, playing many roles with Piro Xeci, Pandi Angjeli, Pasko Ziko, Kopi Ambon, etc. In 1962, with the creation of the Professional Variety, she became a professional actress. Zagorka also took part in Albanian films such as "Kapedani", playing the wife of uncle Sulo, "Mengjese lufte", "Rrugicat qe kerkonin diell", " Zonja nga qyteti", "Dita e pare e emerimit". Zagorka Shuke has been honored by the municipal council of the city of Pogradec with the title "Pride of the City".

References 

20th-century Albanian actresses
1914 births
People from Ohrid
2000 deaths
Yugoslav emigrants to Albania